Paul Kennedy (1959-2016) was a clinical psychologist with expertise in spinal cord damage rehabilitation.

Biography
Kennedy was born in Belfast where he attended St. Mary's Christian Brothers' Grammar School, Belfast.  He proceeded to Ulster University where he obtained a BSc in Psychology.  He then undertook training in clinical psychology at Queens University, Belfast.  In 1995, he was awarded a DPhil by Ulster University for a thesis on psychological aspects of spinal injury.

He developed psychological services for the National Spinal Injuries Centre at Stoke Mandeville Hospital.  He also worked to develop the clinical psychology training programme at the University of Oxford where he was appointed Professor of Clinical Psychology.

Publications
 Llewellyn, C., & Kennedy, P. (eds.) (2003). Handbook of Clinical Health Psychology. Chichester: Wiley.
 Kennedy, P. (ed.) (2007). Psychological management of physical disabilities: a practitioner's guide. London: Routledge.
 Beinert, H., Kennedy, P., & Llewellyn, S. (eds.) (2009). Clinical psychology in practice. Chichester: BPS/Blackwell.
 Kennedy, P. (ed.) (2012). The Oxford handbook of rehabilitation psychology. Oxford: Oxford University Press.

Awards
 2014: Outstanding Psychologist, Spinal Injuries Association
 2013: Lifetime Achievement Award, Buckinghamshire Healthcare NHS Trust
 2011: Ludwig-Guttmann Prize, Deutschprachige Medizinsche Gelleschaft Paraplegiologie, Germany
 2002: Distinguished Service Award, American Association of Psychologists and Social Workers in Spinal Cord injury
 1999: Lars Sullivan Award
 1995: Golden Helix Award, Hewlett Packard European Healthcare

References

1959 births
2016 deaths
British psychologists
Irish psychologists
Clinical psychologists
People educated at St. Mary's Christian Brothers' Grammar School, Belfast
Alumni of Ulster University
Alumni of Queen's University Belfast
Fellows of Harris Manchester College, Oxford